Minuscule 121 (in the Gregory-Aland numbering), ε 366 (Soden), is a Greek minuscule manuscript of the New Testament, on parchment leaves. It is dated by a colophon to the year 1284.

Description 

The codex contains the text of the four Gospels on 241 parchment leaves (size ) with one lacuna in Matthew 5:21-8:24. The text is written in one column per page, 24 lines per page. The capital letters in colour.

There is also another division according to the smaller Ammonian Sections (Mark 241 – 16:20), (no references to the Eusebian Canons).

Text 

The Greek text of the codex is a representative of the Byzantine text-type. Hermann von Soden classified it to the textual family Kx. Aland placed it in Category V.

According to the Claremont Profile Method it creates textual cluster 121, as a leader manuscript. Textually it is close to Minuscule 64, 533, 662, 663, 1060, 1297, 1642, and 1665.

History 

According to the colophon it was written in September 1284, by Joasaph.

It was examined by Griesbach, Scholz, Tischendorf, and Paulin Martin. C. R. Gregory saw it in 1884.

It is currently housed at the Bibliothèque Sainte-Geneviève (3398), at Paris.

See also 

 List of New Testament minuscules
 Biblical manuscript
 Textual criticism

References

Further reading 

 J. J. Griesbach, Symbolae criticae ad supplendas et corrigendas variarum N. T. lectionum collectiones (Halle, 1793), pp. CCXXIII-CCXXIV

External links 

 

Greek New Testament minuscules
13th-century biblical manuscripts